Cumiana is a comune (municipality) in the Metropolitan City of Turin in the Italian region Piedmont, located about  southwest of Turin.

Cumiana borders the following municipalities: Giaveno, Trana, Piossasco, Pinasca, Volvera, Pinerolo, Frossasco, Cantalupa, Airasca, and Piscina. Mountains nearby Cumiana include the Monte Tre Denti and Monte Freidour, parts of the Cottian Alps.

Twin towns — sister cities
Cumiana is twinned with:

  San Guillermo, Argentina
 Erlangen, Germany

See also 
 Tavernette
 Zoom di Cumiana

References

External links
 Official website

Cities and towns in Piedmont